Cristina Esmeralda López (born 19 September 1982 in Ozatlán) is a Salvadoran race walker.

When she won the gold medal at the Pan American Games, she made history by winning the first ever gold medal for El Salvador at the games.  Lopez also had the worries of having her 3-year-old daughter Monica Michelle back in El Salvador undergoing medical treatment for cancer. Lopez crossed the finish line in 1:38:59, a full minute and 4 seconds ahead of the second place.

Personal bests

Track walk
10,000 m: 44:16.21 min –  San Salvador, 13 July 2007

Road walk
10 km: 49:02 min –  San Salvador, 30 March 2014
20 km: 1:30:08 hrs –  A Coruña, 4 June 2005

Achievements

References

External links

1982 births
Living people
Salvadoran female racewalkers
Athletes (track and field) at the 2007 Pan American Games
Athletes (track and field) at the 2015 Pan American Games
Pan American Games gold medalists for El Salvador
Pan American Games medalists in athletics (track and field)
Central American and Caribbean Games gold medalists for El Salvador
Central American Games gold medalists for El Salvador
Central American Games medalists in athletics
Central American Games bronze medalists for El Salvador
Competitors at the 2006 Central American and Caribbean Games
Competitors at the 2014 Central American and Caribbean Games
Central American and Caribbean Games medalists in athletics
Medalists at the 2007 Pan American Games